Marianne Curley, (born  20 May 1959) is an Australian author best known for her Guardians of Time Trilogy and Old Magic books.

Life
According to her official biography, Marianne Curley formerly lived in Coffs Harbour, on the Mid North Coast of New South Wales (Australia). She is married with three children.

In 2004, Curley battled Myeliofibrosis also known as bone marrow cancer. Curley received a life saving stem-cell bone marrow transplant from her sister.

Bibliography
Old Magic
Guardians of Time Trilogy
The Named
The Dark
The Key
 The Shadow
 The Avena Trilogy
 Hidden
 Broken
 Fearless
Kids' Night in: Anthology (short story)

See also

 Guardians of Time Trilogy

References

External links
 Official site
 Marianne Curley Fanlisting
 Guardians of Time trilogy Fanlisting

1959 births
Australian fantasy writers
Australian women writers
Living people
Women science fiction and fantasy writers
Guardians of Time Trilogy